Tully Township, Ohio may refer to:
Tully Township, Marion County, Ohio
Tully Township, Van Wert County, Ohio

Ohio township disambiguation pages